Rhizoplaca porteri is a species of crustose lichen in the  family Lecanoraceae.

References

Further reading
Kondratyuk, S. Y., et al. "Molecular phylogeny of placodioid lichen-forming fungi reveal a new genus, Sedelnikovaea." Mycotaxon 129.2 (2015): 269–282.
Leavitt, Steven D., et al. "Fungal specificity and selectivity for algae play a major role in determining lichen partnerships across diverse ecogeographic regions in the lichen‐forming family Parmeliaceae (Ascomycota)." Molecular ecology 24.14 (2015): 3779–3797.

Lecanoraceae
Lichen species
Lichens described in 2013
Taxa named by Helge Thorsten Lumbsch